The FA Cup 1983–84 is the 103rd season of the world's oldest football knockout competition; The Football Association Challenge Cup, or FA Cup for short. The large number of clubs entering the tournament from lower down the English football league system meant that the competition started with a number of preliminary and qualifying rounds. The 28 victorious teams from the Fourth Round Qualifying progressed to the First Round Proper.

Preliminary round

Ties

Replays

1st qualifying round

Ties

Replays

2nd replays

2nd qualifying round

Ties

Replays

2nd replays

3rd qualifying round

Ties

Replays

4th qualifying round
The teams that given byes to this round are Maidstone United, Boston United, Weymouth, Scarborough, Dagenham, Barnet, Worcester City, Kettering Town, Yeovil Town, Stafford Rangers, Wycombe Wanderers, Bishop's Stortford, Sutton United, Mossley, Workington, Minehead, Blyth Spartans, Barking, Harlow Town and Penrith.

Ties

Replays

1983–84 FA Cup
See 1983-84 FA Cup for details of the rounds from the First Round Proper onwards.

External links
Football Club History Database: FA Cup 1983–84
FA Cup Past Results

Qual
FA Cup qualifying rounds